V372 Carinae is a single star in the southern constellation of Carina.  Located around 1300 light-years distant. It shines with a luminosity approximately 1742 times that of the Sun and has a surface temperature of 14132 K. It is a Beta Cephei variable.

References

B-type main-sequence stars
B-type subgiants
Beta Cephei variables
Carina (constellation)
Carinae, b1
Durchmusterung objects
064722
038438
3582
Carinae, V372